Rafflesia rochussenii is a parasitic plant species of the genus Rafflesia. It is endemic to the Indonesian island of Java.

References

External links
 Parasitic Plant Connection: Rafflesia rochussenii page

rochussenii
Parasitic plants
Endemic flora of Java